"Midnight Fire" is a song written by Dave Gibson and Lewis Anderson, and recorded by American country music artist Steve Wariner.  It was released in August 1983 as the first single and title track from the album Midnight Fire.  The song reached #5 on the Billboard Hot Country Singles & Tracks chart.

Chart performance

References

1983 singles
1983 songs
Steve Wariner songs
RCA Records singles
Songs written by Lewis Anderson
Song recordings produced by Tony Brown (record producer)
Song recordings produced by Norro Wilson
Songs written by Dave Gibson (American songwriter)